Asterolepis glycera is a species of moth of the family Tortricidae. It is found in Australia, where it has been recorded from Queensland.

The forewings are whitish-ochreous with ochreous markings, infuscated on the costa and with numerous tufts of raised scales, as well as a few scattered black specks. The central fascia is distinct on the costal half, moderate and terminated beneath by a black scale tuft in the middle of the disc. There are four or five small spots on the costa posteriorly, and indications of striae proceeding from these. The hindwings are grey-whitish.

References

Moths described in 1910
Tortricini
Moths of Australia
Taxa named by Edward Meyrick